Pelosia tanala is a moth of the family Erebidae first described by Hervé de Toulgoët in 1956. It is found on Madagascar.

References

 

Lithosiina
Moths described in 1956